French Dressing is a 1927 silent film romantic comedy directed by Allan Dwan and starring H. B. Warner. It was produced and distributed by First National Pictures .

This film is now lost.

Cast
H. B. Warner - Phillip Grey
Clive Brook - Henri de Briac
Lois Wilson - Cynthia Grey
Lilyan Tashman - Peggy Nash

uncredited
Tim Holt
Hedda Hopper

References

External list

French Dressing film review at New York Times

1927 films
1927 romantic comedy films
American romantic comedy films
Films directed by Allan Dwan
First National Pictures films
American black-and-white films
Lost American films
American silent feature films
Films set in Paris
1927 lost films
1920s American films
Silent romantic comedy films
Silent American comedy films